My Village at Sunset  is a 1992 Cambodian romantic drama film directed by Norodom Sihanouk.

Plot
After the 1991 peace agreements, Sieha, a doctor, returns from Paris, France to volunteer his services at a clinic in Siem Reap. The two of them performed surgical operations on patients injured by land mines. Sieha stays in a house with Dara, who is a teacher in the village. Her husband Sok is disabled because of the war. Dara tries to court Sieha. Meanwhile, Sieha marries Neari, a nurse. After relieving her anger, Dara moves to Phnom Penh. Neari and her sister, who works in a factory producing prostheses, agree to take care of Sok. Despite this, Sok commits suicide. The aggrieved Sieha decides to join a de-mining team and died in a mission.

Cast
San Chariya   
Norodom Sihamoni   
Ros Sarocun

External links
 

1992 films
Cambodian drama films
Khmer-language films
1992 romantic drama films